Biķernieki is a settlement in Biķernieki Parish, Augšdaugava Municipality in the Latgale region of Latvia.

References

External links 
Satellite map at Maplandia.com

Towns and villages in Latvia
Augšdaugava Municipality
Latgale